Andrew or Andy Aitken may refer to:

Andrew Aitken (footballer, born 1909) (1909–1984), English footballer
Andrew Aitken (rugby union) (born 1968), South African international rugby union player
Andy Aitken (footballer, born 1877) (1877–1955), Scottish footballer for Newcastle United, Middlesbrough, Scotland 
Andy Aitken (footballer, born 1919) (1919–2000), Scottish footballer
Andy Aitken (footballer, born 1934) (1934–2005), Scottish footballer
Andy Aitken (footballer, born 1978), Scottish footballer
Andrew Peebles Aitken (1843–1904), Scottish agricultural chemist